Marcello Alves (born July 28, 1983 in Curitiba) is a Brazilian footballer, who most recently played for Norfolk SharX in the Major Indoor Soccer League.

Career

Brazil
Alves played with the youth teams at several stories Brazilian clubs, including Atlético Paranaense, Coritiba, Paraná and Joinville Esporte Clube before turning professional in 2002 at the age of 19. He went on to play for a number of teams in the Brazilian lower leagues, including Avenida, Pato Branco, Tiradentes and Francisco Beltrão.

North America
Alves signed with the USL PRO Charlotte Eagles in 2010. He made his debut for the team on May 7, 2010 in a 2-1 win over the Harrisburg City Islanders.

Alves was not listed on the 2011 roster for Charlotte and, having been able to secure a professional contract elsewhere, signed for the Virginia Beach Piranhas of the USL Premier Development League for the 2011 season. He scored a goal on his Piranhas debut on May 7, 2011, a 2-0 victory over Fredericksburg Hotspur and was named PDL national Team of the Week. Marcello finished the season as the team leading scorer and as the team captain as well.

References

External links
 Charlotte Eagles bio

1983 births
Living people
Brazilian footballers
Brazilian expatriate footballers
Pato Branco Esporte Clube players
Charlotte Eagles players
Virginia Beach Piranhas players
Expatriate soccer players in the United States
USL Second Division players
USL League Two players
Association football forwards
Brazilian expatriate sportspeople in the United States
Brazilian football managers
Brazilian expatriate football managers
Expatriate soccer managers in the United States
High school soccer coaches in the United States
Footballers from Curitiba